This is a list of the main career statistics of the French professional tennis player Caroline Garcia. Garcia has won eleven singles and seven doubles titles on the WTA Tour. Her most significant singles titles are the 2022 WTA Finals, Premier 5 Wuhan Open and the Premier Mandatory China Open, both achieved in 2017 and WTA 1000 Cincinnati Open in 2022. In doubles, she has won two Grand Slam titles at the French Open in 2016 and 2022 and one Premier Mandatory Madrid Open, also in 2016. Garcia became the world No. 2 doubles player on 24 October 2016, and she achieved her highest singles ranking of world No. 4 in September 2018.

In singles, she also reached the quarter-finals of the French Open in 2016, as well as the semi-finals of the Madrid Open in 2018. She was a quarter-finalist at the Madrid Open and Wuhan Open in 2014, the Canadian Open in 2017 and the WTA Qatar Open, Italian Open and Canadian Open in 2018. In 2017 she reached the semi-finals of the year-end championship WTA Finals.

In doubles, along with her Grand Slam title, she finished as runner–up at the US Open in 2016, semi-finalist at the Australian Open in 2017 and quarter-finalist at the 2016 Wimbledon and 2015 US Open. In Premier-level tournaments, she finished as runner-up at the 2014 Wuhan Open, 2015 Canadian Open and 2016 China Open. At the WTA Finals, she was a semi-finalist in 2016.

Performance timelines

Only main-draw results in WTA Tour, Grand Slam tournaments, Fed Cup/Billie Jean King Cup and Olympic Games are included in win–loss records.

Singles
Current through the 2023 BNP Paribas Open.

Doubles
Current after the 2023 United Cup.

Grand Slam finals
Garcia has reached three Grand Slam finals in doubles. First, she reached final of French Open in 2016 alongside Kristina Mladenovic, where they defeated Russian combination Ekaterina Makarova–Elena Vesnina in three-sets. Later the same year, Garcia again with Mladenovic reached another Grand Slam final at the US Open, losing to Bethanie Mattek-Sands and Lucie Šafářová. In 2022, she won the French Open doubles title again alongside Mladenovic, defeating Coco Gauff and Jessica Pegula in the final.

Doubles: 3 (2 titles, 1 runner-up)

Other significant finals
In singles, Garcia has won one Premier 5 tournament at the Wuhan Open, and one Premier Mandatory tournament in China Open, both in 2017. In doubles, she has won one Premier Mandatory title at the Madrid Open in 2016. She also finished as runner-up at the two Premier 5 tournaments, Wuhan Open in 2014 and Canadian Open in 2015 and at one Premier Mandatory tournament, the China Open in 2016.

WTA Championships finals

Singles: 1 (title)

WTA 1000 finals

Singles: 3 (3 titles)

Doubles: 4 (1 title, 3 runner-ups)

WTA career finals
Garcia debuted at the WTA Tour in 2011 at the Australian Open. Since then, she has reached 15 singles finals, winning 11 of them, including three WTA 1000 titles at the 2017 Wuhan Open, the 2017 China Open, and the Western & Southern Open in 2022, as well as the 2022 WTA Finals. In doubles, she reached 17 finals, winning seven of them, including French Open titles in 2016 and 2022 alongside Kristina Mladenovic. In 2016, Garcia was part of France Fed Cup Team in the final against Czech Republic, where they lost 2–3.

Singles: 16 (11 titles, 5 runner-ups)

Doubles: 17 (7 titles, 10 runner–ups)

Team competition: 2 (1 win, 1 loss)

WTA 125 tournament finals

Singles: 2 (1 title, 1 runner-up)

Doubles: 1 (1 title)

ITF Circuit finals
Garcia debuted at the ITF Women's World Tennis Tour in 2008 at the $10K event in Bournemouth in the United Kingdom. In singles, she has been in four finals and has won only one of them, while in doubles she has been in four finals and has won two of them. Her biggest title on the ITF Tour was $100K Open de Cagnes-sur-Mer in singles event in May 2013, while in doubles she has won $50K Open Saint-Gaudens in 2011, also in France.

Singles: 4 (1 title, 3 runner–ups)

Doubles: 4 (2 titles, 2 runner–ups)

WTA Tour career earnings
Current after the 2022 Toray Pan Pacific Open.

Career Grand Slam statistics 
Garcia first been seeded at the French Open in 2015 as seed No. 31. Season of 2017, was her first season when she was seeded at the all Grand Slams in a singles year. During the 2018 season, she was seeded at the all Grand Slams as 8th seed or higher. She was highest seeded at the Wimbledon and US Open in 2018 as seed No. 6.

Grand Slam tournament seedings
The tournaments won by Garcia are in boldface, and advanced into finals by Garcia are in italics.

Record against other players

No. 1 wins

Record against top-10 players 

 She has a  record against players who were, at the time the match was played, ranked in the top 10.

Longest winning streaks

11-match win streak (2017)

11-match win streak (2022)

Notes

References

External links
 
 

Garcia, Caroline